Chariesthes freya is a species of beetle in the family Cerambycidae. It was described by Karl Jordan in 1894. It is known from the Ivory Coast, Gabon, the Republic of the Congo, and the Democratic Republic of the Congo. It contains the variety Chariesthes freya var. itzingeri.

References

Chariesthes
Beetles described in 1894